This is a list of films which placed number one at the weekend box office for the year 2020.

Number-one films

Notes 
According to Comscore, for this weekend Sony did not report any numbers.

References

See also
 Cinema of Austria 

Austria
2020